Alive '05 is a live album by the alternative rock band Local H. It was released on September 13, 2005 on Cleopatra Records.

It is the first official live album released by the band. The album is compiled from a couple live shows, one of which was on September 17, 2004 in Chicago at The Metro. The last track on the album is a studio recording of a cover of "Toxic", originally performed by Britney Spears. The CD also contains 4 fan made music videos, two for "Cooler Heads" and one each for  "No Fun" and "California Songs".

The album is also known by other names. The front cover says Local H Comes Alive!—a take on Frampton Comes Alive!, the spine says "LOCAL H – LIVE" on one side and "LOCAL H – DEAD" on the other, and the inside image says Alive '05, which is what the band calls the album.

On July 16, 2007 it received an Australian release doubled with Whatever Happened to P.J. Soles?

Track listing
All songs by Local H unless otherwise noted.
 "Everyone Alive" – 4:22
 "Bound for the Floor – 3:34
 "Lovey Dovey – 2:36
 "Heaven on the Way Down – 2:29
 "Hands on the Bible – 4:21
 "Manipulator – 4:16
 "All the Kids Are Right – 3:21
 "All-Right (Oh, Yeah) – 3:44
 "Hey, Rita – 5:00
 "Deep Cut – 2:05
 "President Forever – 3:34
 "How's the Weather Down There?  – 3:30
 "Fritz's Corner – 3:35
 "Creature Comforted – 3:50
 "No Problem – 6:23
 "California Songs – 4:02
 "Hi-Fiving MF – 7:54
 "Toxic" (Cathy Dennis, Henrik Jonback, Christian Karlsson, Pontus Winnberg) – 5:54

Personnel
Brian St. Clair – drums
Scott Lucas – vocals, guitar, bass
Gabe Rodriguez – tambourine, backing vocals on track 7, 8, & 13

Local H albums
2005 live albums
Cleopatra Records live albums